Silver sulfate is the inorganic compound with the formula Ag2SO4.  It is a white solid with low solubility in water.

Preparation and structure
Silver sulfate precipitates as a solid when an aqueous solution of silver nitrate is treated with sulfuric acid:
2AgNO3  + H2SO4 →  Ag2SO4 + 2HNO3
It is purified by recrystallization from concentrated sulfuric acid, a step that expels traces of nitrate.
Silver sulfate and anhydrous sodium sulfate adopt the same structure.

Silver(II) sulfate
The synthesis of silver(II) sulfate (AgSO4) with a divalent silver ion instead of a monovalent silver ion was first reported in 2010 by adding sulfuric acid to silver(II) fluoride (HF escapes). It is a black solid that decomposes exothermally at 120 °C with evolution of oxygen and the formation of the pyrosulfate.

AgF2+H2SO4 →AgSO4 +2HF

References

Silver compounds
Sulfates